is a Japanese footballer who plays as a defender for Zweigen Kanazawa.

Club career
Yamashita made his professional debut in a 1–4 Emperor's Cup loss against Albirex Niigata.

Career statistics

Club

References

External links

2004 births
Living people
Association football people from Ishikawa Prefecture
Japanese footballers
Association football defenders
Zweigen Kanazawa players